Kapitan China Chung Keng Quee (Pha̍k-fa-sṳ: Chhang Kín-kui, 182713 December1901) was the founder and administrator of modern Taiping in Perak, Malaysia. Appointed "Capitan China" by the British in 1877, he was a millionaire philanthropist and known as an innovator in the mining of tin. He was involved in many other industries including farming, pawnbroking and logging. He was respected by both Chinese and European communities in the early colonial settlement. His survival in the chaotic era owes much to his standing as leader of the Hai San, a Chinese secret society in British Malaya during the time of the Larut Wars (1862–73). a position he is said to have held till early 1884 although in all probability he continued to remain a leading member. The old fort at Teluk Batu was built by him to safeguard the mine that he opened there. He was a member of the Commission for the Pacification of Larut and sat as one of six members of the Advisory Perak State Council appointed by the British. Commenting on the role of the Perak Council, Richard James Wilkinson wrote,

"It is for the reader, in the light of subsequent events, to judge how far the Councillors were right or wrong, and to see for himself who really did the pioneer work of building up the prosperity of Perak. In the published accounts of British rule in Malaya, sufficient prominence has not always been given to the efforts of these early pioneers; the reaper, intent on his own work, is apt to forget the man who sowed. These Council Minutes are the record of the work of the sowers. A study of that record will show how much the State owes to Sir Hugh Low and to his fellow-Councillors, especially Raja Dris (the present Sultan), Sir William Maxwell, and the Chinese towkays, Ah Kwi [Chung Keng Quee] and Ah Yam."

Early history 
Third among his father's five sons, Chung Keng Quee was born into a peasant Hakka family in Xin Cun (新村) village, Cheng Sheng (Zengcheng 增城) county of Guangdong province, China.  At the time of his death the Perak Pioneer & Native States Advertiser VOL VIII Taiping Saturday 14 December 1901 reports: "Precise information as to the date of his arrival in Perak is difficult to obtain but it is apparently certain that he has passed over forty-five years in the State before he retired to Penang." It is believed that in 1841, he journeyed from China to British Malaya in a junk, sent by his mother, Madam Lai, to look for his father, Chung, Hsing Fah (Chung, Xingfa 郑兴发; Hakka: Chang Hin Fatt). He had left his wife (Madam Lin) in China to look after his elderly mother. He is thought to have been 20 years of age at that time. Chung Hsing Fa, had come to Malaya as an indentured labourer during a time of great turbulence in China to make a living and support his family in China (see First and Second Opium Wars and Taiping Rebellion). After some time when Madam Lai received no news from her husband she sent Chung Keng Seng (鄭景勝 / 郑景胜), her second son. Still receiving no news, she then sent Keng Quee. When Keng Quee arrived in Perak, he discovered that both his father Hsing Fa and his brother Keng Seng were by that time well established in business. In fact, Keng Seng was so popular he was known as Lui Kong Seng (literally Thunder God Seng). His father, Hsing Fa was one of the early leaders of the Tseng Lung association on King Street. Keng Quee entered the mining business which his father and brother were engaged in. By 1860 he controlled the Penang-based Hai San Secret Society as well as the Larut tin-fields the Hai San were associated with. Information about his career before that time is generally unknown.

Names 
Chung's name has been spelt in many different ways due to differences of dialect and transliteration. Apart from Chung Keng Quee, the name has also been spelt Cheng Ching-kuei, Chang Ching-kuei, Chung Keng Kwee and Chang Ah Quee. Chung has also been spelt Chang, Chan, Cheng, Cheang. Keng has also been spelt Chin, Kung, King etc. Quee has also been spelt Kooi, Kwee, Kwi, Kuei and Kui. He has also been known as Teh Keng Quee (Zheng4 is Teh in Hokkien), Ah Quee, Ah Kwi, Ah Kooi etc. Upon receiving his honorary title from the Chinese Imperial Court, he took to using the "fancy" names Cheng Sheng Chih, Cheang Shin Thong and Cheng Ssu-Wen.

Larut Wars 

Around 1848 'Che Long Ja'afar introduced Chinese miners to Larut (spelt Laroot or Larot at that time). The original mine field, Klian Pauh is where the jail at Taiping stands today. Long Ja'afar appointed Low Sam from Penang as agent and Low Sam was associated with Chung Keng Quee.

According to Chung Keng Quee in his evidence provided to the Straits Government, the development of the Larut tin fields was initiated by Malay Chief 'Che Long Ja'afar by advancing money to the Chinese miners in his district to work the mines and it was only in his son Ngah Ibrahim's time (c. 1858-74) that the Chinese worked the mines with their own money.

At a time when Ngah Ibrahim was administrator of Larut the Chinese had increased in number and in early 1860 two large groups were formed by the Chinese, the "Five Associations" whose members worked in the mines of Klian Pauh and the "Four Associations" whose members worked in the mines of Klian Baharu.

Mining rights were given to the Hakka "Five Associations" or Go-Kuan ( or ) (Hakka: Ng Khiun) and the Cantonese "Four Associations" or Si-Kuan (四馆). Chung Keng Quee was leader of the Hakka Go-Kuan and the Hai San (Hakka: Hoi San) society they were aligned with and began to operate his tin mines in Larut (see Larut, Matang) in 1860.

Many Hakka fled China when the Taiping Rebellion broke out there and found work in the mines of Chung, Keng Quee establishing his position over the mining area in Larut as leader of the Hai San from 1860 to 1884.

Larut was destined to be plagued by four major wars between members of the Ghee Hin Society that owned the Cantonese Si-Kuan on the one hand and the Hakka Hai San and Hokkien Tua Pek Kong societies on the other hand. While the first of the Larut wars broke out over land and water rights, the rivalry between the two groups already existed in Ujong Salang, Selangor, Penang, Singapore and Kwangtung itself where both groups fought with each other between 1855 and 1868.

To many people it appeared that the trouble in Larut was merely a continuation of the trouble between the Ghee Hin and Tua Pek Kong societies in Ujong Salang in 1859 which later spread to Penang. The Larut Wars were fought between Hakka and Hakka. The Hai San miners were mainly Hakka men from Cheng Sheng. The first two battles (1861 and 1865) were between the Cheng Sheng Hakka of the Hai San and the Hui Chew Hakka of the Ghee Hin. The Last two (1872 and 1873) were between the Cheng Sheng Hakka of the Hai San and the Sin Neng Hakka of the Ghee Hin, the Hui Chew Hakka from the Ghee Hin from the earlier two battles having gone down to Selangor to join Yap Ah Loy, a Hui Chew Hakka who was head of the Hai San in Selangor. Lee Ah Kun (Lee Ko Yin), Ho Ghi Siu and Chin Seng Yam (陈亚炎, Chin Ah Yam 陳亞炎) were Sin Neng Hakka.

First Larut War (1861) 
The First Larut War began in July 1861 when arguments over control of watercourse to their mines escalated and led members of the Hai San Society to drive the members of the Ghee Hin society out of Klian Bahru (now known as Kamunting). The Governor of Straits Settlement, Colonel William Orfeur Cavenagh intervened and the Mentri of Larut, Ngah Ibrahim, was made to compensate the Ghee Hin with $17,447 on behalf of the Sultan of Perak.

Second Larut War (1865) 
The Second Larut War took place in 1865 and was sparked off by a gambling quarrel in June of that year between members of the two opposing secret societies. According to Parkinson in his book British Intervention in Malaya 1867-1877 the "Hysan or Tokong" leader in Penang was "Chan Keng Kwi", with "Lew Ah Sam" as leader in Larut.

The Hai San members took 14 Ghee Hin as prisoners, 13 of whom were killed. The 14th escaped to inform his clan and the Ghee Hin retaliated by attacking the Hai San village, razing it to the ground and killing 40 men in the process.

The battle continued back and forth and spread to Province Wellesley and the island of Penang and other secret societies joined the fray. Both sides, exhausted, finally came to terms. An official inquiry took place and both the Hai San and Ghee Hin societies were fined $5,000 each for violating the peace of Penang and their leaders, banished.

So Ah Chiang, leader of the Ghee Hin was captured by Ngah Ibrahim at Teluk Kertang (Port Weld) and executed.

By around 1870 there were a combined total of about 40,000 Hakka and Cantonese mine workers in the Larut district and the mining areas between the two groups were near to each other. It is this proximity that might explain how the next battle began.

Third Larut War (1872) 
According to Charles John Irving, then Auditor-General of the Straits Settlements, and later Acting Lieutenant-Governor of Penang, there were about 20,000 to 25,000 Chinese in Larut around February 1872, 2,000 to 3,000 of whom were Cantonese or "Macao Men" as he referred to them, and the remainder being Khay (Hakka) men from Cheng Sheng and Sin Neng.

In February 1872 Cheng Sheng miners had a dispute with Sin Neng miners over the boundaries of some mining lands. Lee Ah Kun (Lee Ko Yin) represented the Sin Neng and attempted to negotiate but was murdered on 16 February on the pretext of an adulterous affair.

It has been believed that The Third Larut War erupted in 1872 over a scandal involving the Lee Ah Kun (李亞勤 / 李亚勤), the attorney at Larut (for the Ghee Hin leader Ho Ghi Sui) and the wife of a nephew of the Hai San leader, Chung, Keng Quee. It is said that upon discovery, the allegedly adulterous couple was caught, tortured, put into a pig basket and thrown into a disused mining pond where they drowned.

Supposedly to avenge the death of their leader, the Ghee Hin had 4,000 professional fighting men (brought in from China via Penang) attack the Hai Sans. For the first time, the Hai Sans were driven out of Larut. About 10,000 Hai San men sought sanctuary in Penang. It took months before the Hai Sans, supported by Ngah Ibrahim recovered their Matang and Larut mines.

Others hold that the alleged "intrigue" never happened and was merely a political fiction to justify the murder of Ah Kun (aka Lee Coyn) in a manner that would permit Tokong to save face for the death sentence passed down on their leader Khoo Thean Tek for his part in the Penang Riots of 1869 where Ah Kun apparently got off Scot free.

At this time, Raja Abdullah a claimant to the royal throne of Perak and an enemy of Ngah Ibrahim, took sides against the Hai Sans and Ngah Ibrahim.

On 26 September 1872, Chung Keng Quee signed a petition together with 44 other Chinese leaders, seeking British interference following the attack of 12,000 men of Chung Shan by 2,000 men of Sen Ning. (See The Petition of Chung Keng Quee & 44 Others and The humble petition of Ah Yeu, Ung Keng Sin, Soh Ah Pang, Su Ah Fooed, and others)

Fourth Larut War (1873) 
The Fourth Larut War occurred in 1873, merely a year after the previous battle. Weeks after the Hai Sans regained Larut, the Ghee Hin, supported by Raja Abdullah, counter-attacked with arms and men from Singapore and China. Ngah Ibrahim's properties in Matang were destroyed. Local Malay residents were also killed and their property, destroyed. Trouble spread to Krian, Pangkor and Dindings.

The quarrelling Malay chiefs who had taken sides in the Larut Wars were now alarmed at the disorder created by the Chinese miners and secret societies.  The Straits Settlement Penang Chinese seeing their investments destroyed in the Larut Wars sought intervention form British. Over 40,000 Chinese from the Go-Kuan and Si-Kuan were engaged in the fratricidal war involving the Perak royal family.

In August 1873, Archibald Edward Harbord Anson, the last Lieutenant-Governor of Penang, sought to bring about a ceasefire between the two parties and convened a meeting at the beginning of the month attended, apart from Anson, by Chung Keng Quee (Hai San), Ho Ghi Sui (Ghee Hin), Foo Tye Sin (pro-Hai San), Ngah Ibrahim (pro-Hai San), Abdullah (pro-Ghee Hin), Tengku Kudin (pro-Abdullah) and a British Naval Captain.

The two sides agreed to keep the peace pending British arbitration with Ngah Ibrahim taking responsibility for the Hai San and Abdullah taking responsibility for the Ghee Hin. Abdullah failed so completely in his task in ensuring the Ghee Hin kept the peace that the British were prompted to back Ngah Ibrahim and the Hai San.

On 3 September 1873 outgoing Straits Settlements Governor Sir Harry Ord recognised Ngah Ibrahim, through a proclamation, as the independent (i.e. independent of Perak rule) ruler of Larut.  On 5 September he temporarily lifted an arms embargo (imposed since February) just long enough for the Hai San in Larut to receive munitions.  In the middle of that month a British vessel got into an entanglement with some Ghee Hin junks and this led to British bombardment and capture of Ghee hin stockades at Matang and Kuala Selinsing.

Ngah Ibrahim's Penang residence was blown up on 16 September 1873. A week later two things happened - a similar attempt was made on Chung Keng Quee's house and Abdullah and his Ghee Hin cohorts were arrested at sea and brought back to Penang where they were eventually released but forbidden to return to Perak.

Abdullah's mission to Singapore 
Meantime the Perak sultanate, involved in a protracted succession struggle was unable to maintain order. Things were increasingly getting out of hand and chaos was proving bad for the Malays, Chinese and British. In her book "The Golden Chersonese and The Way Thither" (Published 1892 G.P. Putnam's Sons) Victorian traveller and adventuress Isabella Lucy Bird (1831–1904) describes how Raja Muda Abdullah as he then was turned to the head of the Ghee Hin in Singapore, Tan Kim Ching.

Abdullah met with Tan in Singapore in October 1873. He was accompanied by Raja Dris, the Shahbandar and a Penang lawyer. Tan offered to put Abdullah on the throne in return for five elevenths (5/11) of all duties collected between Telok Serah and Krian for a period of ten years.

Tan Kim Ching introduced Abdullah to William Henry Macleod Read (W. H. M. Read) and Read in turn introduced Abdullah to Sir Henry Ord on the eve of Ord's retirement as Governor of the Straits Settlements. A letter was drafted by Tan and Read on Abdullah's behalf to new incoming Governor Sir Andrew Clarke seeking British recognition of Abdullah as ruler of Perak, British protection and the provision of "a man of sufficient abilities to live with us in Perak. .. and show us a good system of government for our dominions. .."

The letter dated 30 December 1873 did not reach Clarke's hands till 9 January 1874 by which time he had already taken the first steps towards bringing Perak under British control.

Sir Andrew Clarke takes charge 
Clarke's main objective was to mediate peace between the two Chinese factions and settle their differences so that tin production could resume and threats to the internal security of British-held Penang would cease. Parkinson tells us in British Intervention in Malaya 1867-1877 that Sir Andrew Clarke decided to summon the Chinese factions to a conference following a meeting on or about 9 January 1874 between Chung Keng Quee and the Hai San headmen and Pickering (together with McNair and Dunlop) who had been sent to meet them at the mouth of the Larut River to persuade them to accept arbitration.

Sir Andrew Clarke, just weeks after his arrival in Singapore, had already found evidence of the continuing disturbances in Perak and Selangor. Apart from his executive council, he talked to Tan Kim Ching. Clarke decided that both the Hai San and Ghee Hin should have access to Larut with neither side being excluded, a complete reversal of the policy of his predecessor, Sir Henry Ord. Tan Kim Ching agreed and wrote to the Ghee Hin at Penang to put this to them and advocate peace.

Clarke then sent Pickering to Penang to talk to the respective headmen in Penang. Pickering gave Tan Kim Ching's letter to Chin Ah Yam (陳亞炎 / 陈亚炎). Twenty Ghee Hin headmen met through the night at the Ghee Hin Kongsi house considering Tan Kim Ching's letter. In the morning they met with Pickering and agreed to surrender their forces in seven days time. It was also at this time that Clarke saw an opportunity to settle the question of succession to the throne in Perak and to make use of that as a means to further British interests in the Malay Peninsula by getting the sultan to accept a British Resident.

Following the surrender of the Ghee Hin to Pickering and the outcome of a meeting with Chung Keng Quee whom Pickering also met, Sir Andrew Clarke then gathered the main Chinese leaders (principally Chung Keng Quee and Chin Ah Yam and some Malays – including Abdullah – at Pulau Pangkor where the 'Pangkor Engagement' was formulated and signed, recognising Abdullah as Sultan, and getting the Chinese to agree to settle their differences in Larut under British arbitration.

Pangkor Engagement 
The need to restore law and order in Perak gave cause for a new British policy concerning intervention in the affairs of the Malay States which resulted in the Treaty of Pangkor.

On 20 January 1874, the Straits Settlements governor Sir Andrew Clarke convened a meeting aboard the H. M. S. Pluto anchored off Pangkor island. Documents were signed aboard the ship The Pluto at Pangkor Island to settle the Chinese dispute, clear the Sultan succession dispute and pave the way for the acceptance of British Residency - Captain Speedy was appointed to administer Larut as assistant to the British Resident. Abdullah was recognised as Sultan by the British and was to be installed on the throne of Perak in preference to his rival, Sultan Ismail.

In actuality there were two distinctive agreements made. The primary agreement was intended to ensure an end to the fighting between Ghee Hin and Hai San and pave the way for peaceful coexistence in future. The second, to settle the issue of succession in Perak.

Tate in The Making of Modern South-East Asia says of these that "the first one, which had been ready for over a week prior to the signing, concerned Larut and provided for a settlement between the Hai San and Ghee Ghin which both sides respected and carried out satisfactorily. The second (more recently drafted) agreement concerned the succession dispute around the Perak throne and was unsatisfactory from the very beginning."

Chinese Engagement 
Chung, Keng Quee was one of the two main signatories to the treaty known as the Pangkor Engagement (copy of treaty) entered into aboard the H.M.S. Pluto at Pangkor Island by twenty-six headmen of the Chinese Secret Societies. Chung, Keng Quee and Chin, Ah Yam, leaders of the Hai San and Ghee Hin, respectively, were ennobled by the British with the title of Kapitan China (leader of the Chinese community) and the town of Larut was renamed Taiping ("太平" in Chinese, meaning "everlasting peace") as a confirmation of the new state of truce.

Malay Engagement 
There were three possibilities for the Perak throne and of these only one was present at the meeting - Abdullah. Sultan Ismail who was the crowned ruler, had refused to attend. The British did not appear to know of the existence of the third possible claimant, Raja Yusof, who was naturally not invited.

The agreement that was signed recognised Abdullah as Sultan giving Ismail the status of Sultan Muda, and provided for a British officer called Resident whose advice must be asked and acted upon on all questions other than those touching on Malay Religion and Custom. Ngah Ibrahim's position in Larut as granted by Sultan Ja'afar and confirmed by Sultan Ali was recognised.

However, as far as the chiefs of Perak (who were not present) were concerned (with this agreement made between the British and Abdullah or the British's recognition of Abdullah as Sultan) - the issue of succession was settled three years earlier with the election of Sultan Ismail. To these Chiefs the British may have proclaimed Abdullah Sultan but his accession was not valid in their eyes and indeed in Malay eyes if he did not hold the (royal) regalia which was at that time in the hands of Sultan Ismail, all attempts at recovering these from him having failed.

Pacification Commission 
Three days afterwards, Chung, Keng Quee was appointed a member of Commission for the Pacification of Larut also comprising Captain S. Dunlop, John Frederick Adolphus McNair, Frank Swettenham, W. A. Pickering and Chin Seng Yam, whose terms of reference, among others, was to arrange for an amicable settlement relating to the Larut tin mines. The Commissioners after due investigation and deliberation decided to hand the mines in Klian Pauh (Taiping) over to the Hai Sans and the mines in Klian Bharu (Kamunting) to the Ghee Hins.

Perak Council 
Sir Hugh Low established the Perak State Council in 1877. Kapitan Chung, Keng Quee was appointed a member of the State Council of Perak (there were six members of the council, four Malays and two Chinese) which held its first meeting at Kuala Kangsar on 10 September 1877. The other members of the Council present were Raja Yussof (the Raja Muda), Sir Hugh Low (Resident), Captain Tristram Speedy (Assistant Resident), Raja Dris', Orang Kaya Temenggong, and Kapitan Chin Seng yam, Che Karim of Selama being absent. His magnanimity is manifestly clear from the Council Minutes of Perak in "Papers on Malay Subjects" by Richard James Wilkinson, F. M. S. (Federation of Malay States) Government Press, Kuala Lumpur, 1908. He was the first of three generations to serve on the council, his son Chung Thye Phin and his grandson Chung Kok Ming following in his footsteps.

Anecdotes 
 Chung Keng Kwee, when reminded of the Larut Wars by an inquiring visitor, dismissed the subject with an expression of distaste - 'Banyak rugi!' (meaning 'Big loss!) -- see The Protected Malay States: 1874–1895.
 Chung Keng Quee and Chin Seng Yam (Chin Ah Yam) having made peace with each other became fast friends, going so far as to have Ah Yam become the Ch' Yeh or godfather of Keng Quee's fourth son, Chung Thye Phin.

Sir Hugh Low's letter of vindication 
The September 1891 issue of Harpers's New Monthly Magazine (Volume 83, Issue 489) carried an article on Chinese Secret Societies and credited Chung Keng Quee with wealth amounting to two million Sterling. The article also stated that Chung, Keng Quee was tried for murder an accusation that was refuted following the publication of a letter to the editor from Sir Hugh Low, British Resident at Perak, in the December issue (Volume 84, Issue 499) of the same magazine.

In his letter, Sir Hugh refers to Chung, Keng Quee as "my friend Captain Chang Ah Kwi, of Perak" and "my old friend" and urges the editor to take steps to correct the inaccuracies published earlier which he says do great injustice to his friend.

Sir Hugh Low acknowledged that Chung, Keng Quee was leader of the "Go Kwan faction" in the disturbances that preceded the British intervention under Sir Andrew Clarke, in 1874. He also acknowledged that long after that time when Chung, Keng Quee visited China he was accused of piracy by his rivals in the tin mining business and while he was initially arrested and brought before the mandarins in Canton he was triumphantly acquitted of the charge.

Sir Hugh goes on to state categorically that "Captain Ah Kwi" who was at that time a long-standing member of the State Council, had never ever been "arrested on criminal charges where British influence prevailed", and had in fact from the very beginning "been a strenuous supporter of the settlement of the State of Perak".

The insertion ended with an apology from the author, Frederick Boyle, to the editor of Harper's Magazine.

The relationship between Sir Hugh Low and Chung Keng Quee goes all the way back to Sir Hugh's arrival in Perak. At that time Chung Keng Quee was getting frustrated with the management of the revenue farm that had been given over to him and it was Sir Hugh Low who, as he recalls in his journal "laughed him out of the nonsense about giving up the farm".

The two of them had many long and frank discussions about the mining business in general as well as revenue farming and the system of "advancers". On 15 May 1877 in a casual meeting between the two, Chung Keng Quee advocated the granting of land leases for the mines for periods of 21 years arguing that this would make it easier for miners to raise money. On 11 September the same year, Sir Hugh Low made this so.

For Sir Hugh Low, Chung Keng Quee represented a stabilising factor in mining communities that had yet to settle down following the Larut Wars. His was the voice of reason, admonishing the towkays who had stirred up a riot in 1879 and it was a voice that Sir Hugh trusted and backed up.

Business interests
Chung Keng Quee was involved in many different businesses but he was first and foremost a tin man. Not only did he help his sons start out in the business, he was apt to support others as well. Between 1884 and 1889 Chung Keng Quee sublet a part the land granted to him for his mining activities to a young man starting out in the business, Foo Choo Choon.

Tin mining 
By 1879 there were 80 mines in operation in Larut, owned by 40 firms, with an average of nearly 86 men per mine. The largest mine of all in the country was owned by the Kong Loon Kongsi, in Kamunting, directed by Chung Keng Quee whom Doyle in Mining In Larut describes as:

"an enterprising Chinese gentleman whose appreciation of European appliances is envinced by a centrifugal pump and engine, in supersession of the cumbrous and comparatively useless, Chinese water-wheel."Tin Mining in Larut By Patrick Doyle Published by Spon, 1879; pp. 7, 29, 30

The Kong Loon mine employed 300 coolies, more than any other mine at that time.  Chung, Keng Quee was a wealthy miner who (circa 1889 - 1895) was granted big mining concessions including  (4 km2) in Kinta.

By 1887 Chung Keng Quee was the largest tin producer in Perak accounting for almost 29,000 pikuls or 1,700 tons out of a total state output of about 220,000 pikuls or about 13,000 tons—more than what all the foreign mines put together could produce.

In the early 1890s Chung Keng Quee was reported to own some of the finest tin mines in Sorakai (Kinta) and Kota (Larut). The Government of India sanctioned the grant of a large concession in Mergui for him to prospect for tin. According to the Calcutta Correspondent of The Times, this was "the first attempt to encourage, on a large scale, the mining industry in Mergui."

According to the Ipoh Echo Chung Keng Quee owned the largest alluvial tin mine in the world, the Kwong Lee Mine, which employed 5,000 mining coolies. The Singapore Free Press and Mercantile Advertiser reported, "The largest mine in Perak is aboiut to be closed, the produce having become too limited to be payable. This is the Kwong Lee mine of Kota, the property of Captain Ah Kwi. This excavation has been a show place for some time, and has been visited by many persons out of curiosity because of the large scale on which it has been carried on. It was feared, some few months back, that the mine would give out, and a number of the men employed were discharged. Since then, instead of improving, the wash has diminished in value, and the owner is obliged to relinquish it. It paid remarkably well at one time."

There are those who argue that his were the first true capitalist Chinese enterprises in the country and not those of Yap Ah Loy.

Innovation and leadership 
Chung Keng Quee was the first miner to experiment with hydraulic machinery. He was a progressive miner, farsighted and innovative and this together with his close relationship with Sir Hugh Low helped spur on the economic development of the territory.

In 1878 on a visit to his mines at Larut, Sir William Cleaver Francis Robinson the Governor of the Straits Settlements (1877–1879), was impressed to see a steam pump, installed by the Perak Government at Chung Keng Quee's request on the undertaking that if successful it would be taken over and rented by the mine.

Sir Hugh Low introduced the portable steam pump for draining mines in the protected states in 1878 by first demonstrating its usefulness in Chung Keng Quee's mines. Convinced by the practical results of a real demonstration, owners of large mines in Perak, Selangor and Sungei Ujong soon had similar pumps installed, overcoming the periodic problem of flooding that used to bring work at the mines to a virtual standstill.

Revenue farming 
By 1888 he held the General Farm (taxes upon gambling, spirits and pawnbroking) of Kuala Kangsar, the North and South Larut Coast Farm and the Opium Farm of Lower Perak. In 1890 he obtained the Penang Opium Farm. By 1891 he had the Kinta General Farm and the General Farm and Opium Duty Farm of Kuala Kangsar and in 1895 he had the General Farm of Perak and the Coast and Opium Farms of Lower Perak. He acquired the Kinta General Farm in August 1890 at a considerably reduced price.

In 1889, after the Pangkor settlement of 1874, Sir Hugh Low, British Resident at Perak, gave over most of the Larut and Kurau opium, gambling, spirits, pawnbroking and tobacco farms to Chung, Keng Quee and his business partner, Khoo, Thean Teik. In Penang, Chung, Keng Quee and his friends and relatives made up one of three similar syndicate groups that dominated the Opium Farms there.

Chung Keng Quee apart from being a man of vision was also a great risk-taker. Sir Hugh Low in his own notes describing negotiations over the leasing out of the Perak revenue farms compares Chung Keng Quee and Khoo Thian Teik. Chung Keng Quee had told him that he needed five thousand more coolies to make the venture successful while Khoo Thian Teik had talked of two or three hundred more. Not only did he get his coolies from China, Ah Quee also employed coolies from India.

His exceptional management of the revenue farms entrusted to him helped bring fresh capital into Perak and helped him to become, by 1886, the largest financier in Larut.

While he obviously was making a lot of money from revenue farming, in 1897 Sir Hugh Low, then the Resident, negotiated with Chung, Keng Quee, who was at that time owner of the largest mine in the country and probably the most influential financier of tin mines in the country, to abolish the supply of opium in return for greater protection of tin mine employers from their absconding coolies and for longer working hours.

From 1880 to 1897, in partnership with the Tan, Yeoh, Lim, Cheah, and Khoo families, Chung Keng Quee invested over $2.8 million to dominate all the revenue farms from upper to lower Perak.

Tobacco farming 
He had many tobacco farms in several areas in Perak, including Larut, Kuala Kangsar, Kerian and Selama. Together with Chen Eok he held the Tobacco farms in Larut and Larut Coast between 1883 and 1885.

Reputation for business success 
Chung Keng Quee formed close relationships with the many British Residents of Perak and built a reputation for making mining operations a success. E. W. Birch (Ernest Woodford Birch), seventh British Resident to Perak, left in February 1897 to take up the post of Acting British Resident, Negeri Sembilan and on 15 March 1897, while paying visits of inspection to various parts of the Negri Sembilan, recorded in his papers "I wish we could induce Captain Ah Kwi, of Perak, to enter Lukut and Labu" (The Selangor Journal: Jottings Past and Present, Vol V, 1897 Page 254).

Succession 
His son Chung Thye Phin (then only 22 years of age) was appointed to take over his seat on the Perak State Council in 1900, and upon his death in 1901, his business activities were managed by his son Chung Thye Phin.

Chung Keng Quee and Khoo Thean Teik 
Chung Keng Quee and Khoo Thean Teik were connected both politically and commercially, the politics of the day being commercially motivated in any case. Apart from the monopolies for tobacco, liquor, opium and gambling revenue farming in Perak that these two jointly obtained from Sir Hugh Low, British Resident at Perak in 1889, they were both heads of their respective secret societies which were allied against their common foe, the Ghee Hin. While Chung, Keng Quee was head of the Hai San his ally Khoo, Thean Teik was head of the Tua Pek Kong or Kien Tek Society. Chung, Keng Quee and Khoo, Thean Teik together represented the allied Haisan-Khianteik group of Perak Hakkas and Penang Hockiens.

Both Chung and Khoo were in the business of procuring, supplying or employing coolies. Khoo, Thean Teik aided by Koh, Seang Thye on one occasion supplied $60,000 in goods, money and ammunition to Chung, Keng Quee and Tan, Yit Hoon for their mining activities and for their military activities against the Ghee Hin in return for seven-tenths of the percentage of the tin they produced.

Chung Keng Quee and Foo Choo Choon 
Foo Choo Choon originally worked for Chung Keng Kwee in his Lahat mining concession. He went on to marry a niece of Chung Keng Quee.

The Sri Sarawak 
Chung Keng Quee had a screw steamer, the Sri Sarawak, that plied a route between the Larut river and Penang. This vessel is mentioned in various documents of the time including personal journals. Emily Sadka in the Journal of Sir Hugh Low, Perak, 1877, remarks about an unflattering description of the craft given in Isabella Bird's The Golden Chersonese (and the way thither) p 277 but the unflattering part of Bird's description that Sadka referred to was actually about the pier and not the boat. What Bird said about the Sri Sarawak was that it is "a small but very useful Chinese trading steamer".

Personality 
Chung Keng Quee was a big-hearted philanthropist and in his lifetime his donations, subscriptions and sponsorships benefited many individuals and groups. Together with Cheong Fatt Tze, Chang Yu Nan, Cheah Choon Seng and Tye Kee Yoon, he was part of a group referred to as The Five Great Sponsors. According to Lau-Fong Mak, who says he "is indisputably the century's biggest patron of all," Chung Keng Quee alone accounted for about 92% of the charitable contributions made by the sole three members of the Cantonese-Hakka economic elite between the years 1850 and 1910.

Supporting education

Support for poor scholars in China 
In the absence of Malayan citizenship laws during that time, Kapitan Chung, Keng Quee occasionally visited his home village in China. In commemoration of the birthday of his mother, Madam Lai, Chung, Keng Quee founded and endowed a big scholarship fund for poor Chinese scholars preparing themselves for the time-honoured civil service examinations. He erected a memorial arch (Men fang) for his mother, Madam Lai, in 1886.

Five Luck Villa: school for all Chinese dialect groups 
Chung Keng Quee was a principal director of Ng Fook Hsu Yin (Wufu School) in Penang. In 1893, Chung, Keng Quee, already a millionaire, built a Chinese school in Penang, for all the Chinese children irrespective of their dialects. Having bought over the property in Church Street where the school (the Five Luck Villa also called Goh Hock Tong, Ng Fook Tong and the United Association of Cantonese Districts) was originally located, Chung Keng Quee identified a new site for the school in Chulia Street.

The board membership was made up of four secretaries and 209 assistant secretaries. Chung Keng Quee was its chief secretary. There were nearly 1,300 donors who gave between 5760 and 1 yuan. The largest amount, as well as the building site were donated by Chung Keng Quee. On top of his donations, Chung Keng Quee also gave a loan of 20,000 yuan towards the construction of the new building. The Ch'ien-i bank-society was set up by leading members of the community for this purpose and members of the society invested at least 30 cents a month for 36 months and the interest on these deposits as on the capital were used to repay the Chung Keng Quee's loan. 175 people deposited amounts from 816 yuan (from Chung Keng Quee himself) to 15 yuan. The new building was completed in 1898.

St. Xavier's Institution 
In 1895, the new double-storey building he had erected together with Gan Hong Kee, and Lim Ah Kye (the latter two posthumously), was completed and its inauguration took place on Thursday 28 November at 1.30pm, where Chung Keng Quee and the Honourable Resident Councillor, Henry Trotter, were guests of honour.

Chong Wen She Institute 
In March 1901, just months before he died, Chung, Keng Quee and several other members of the Hakka Associations in Penang established an Educational Institution called Chong Wen She (崇文社). The Educational Institution organised campaigns to encourage the Chinese in Penang to respect education. The motto of the campaigns was "Jing Xi Zi Zhi" or to respect the words written on the paper. The Educational Institution established a free of charge private school for all the children irrespective of their dialects. The school also enrolled the locally born Chinese children with the intention of giving them a classical education so that they would not forget about their roots.

Support for temples

Tua Pek Kong Temples in Tanjung Tokong and King Street, Penang 
Chung, Keng Quee was a principal donor to the Haichu-yu (Sea Pearl) Tua Pek Kong Temple (1865 and 1868) in Tanjung Tokong, Penang. Chung Keng Quee's donation of 150 yuan for the restoration of the temple is inscribed in a stone set up on the occasion, dated 1865 or early 1866 and kept at the Tua Pek Kong Temple in King Street, Penang, which the Tanjung Tokong temple is connected to. The lowest amount recorded is two yuan and the highest is 250 yuan. His donation of 30 yuan is inscribed in a stone (1868) set up by board members of the King Street Tua Pek kong Temple to commemorate the gilding and varnishing of the temple. On the stone he is referred to as Chou T'ung, First Class Assistant Department Magistrate. Two other donors are called Kung-yuan, Senior Licentiate.

Kwangtung and Teochew Cemeteries, Mount Erskine, Penang 
He was the primary benefactor of the Guangdong/Kwangtung and Tingchou/Teochew Cemeteries (1885 and 1901) and Kek Lok Si Temple (1906). At the Kwangtung and Tingchou Cemeteries (Kuang-tung chi T'ing-chou i-shan cemetery for Kuangtung and T'ing-chou Prefecture of Fukien is located in Mount Erskine Road) Chung Keng Quee's donation of 600 yuan towards the construction of a hall for funeral ceremonies is inscribed in a stone dated 1885. Donations ranged from 600 to 10 yuan. A donation of land to the cemetery by Chung Keng Quee and his daughter Kang Neoh (also spelt Keng-niang and Huang Jiang) is recorded in one of two similar stones. One of a set of three stone inscriptions dated 1901 records the 600 yuan donation of Chung Keng Quee (made during the period from 1898 to 1900) as well as the position of secretary held under the name of Hye Kee Chan (Hai-chi chan 海记栈), his company. Chung Keng Quee headed the list of over 250 donors most of whom donated amounts ranging from 100 to 5 yuan.

Kek Lok Si Temple/Pagoda, Penang 
At Kek Lok Si (Chi-lo Ssu/Jili Si), the Temple of Supreme Happiness, on an inscription in stone dated 1906 listing the particulars of donors, it is recorded that Cheng Ssu-wen (Chung Keng Quee) with honorary second rank, donated 6,000 yuan, the 5th largest donation. Another stone inscription, this one dated 1907 recording the origin and development of the temple, shows that Cheng Ssu-wen (Chung Keng Quee) was one of the six senior secretaries of the temple at that time. He was one of the five wealthy patrons from Penang whom Beow Lian convinced (between 1887 and 1891) to form the core support for the construction of the temple, after having selected the site in Ayer Itam. With this, Chung Keng Quee became a director or Da Zongli (Great Prime Minister) of the new temple.

Perak Temples 
Chung Keng Quee was one of the principal donors to the construction of the Yueh-ting ku-miao/Sam-wang tien, Kamunting in the late 1850s and heads the list of donors for the construction of the Sui-ching po miao in Matang in 1883.

Supporting Associations

Chung Association, Penang 
The Teh Kongsi or Teh Si Eng Eong Tong (鄭氏滎陽堂 / 郑氏荥阳堂) or Zhengshi Ying Yang Tang in Penang was first founded by Chung Keng Quee (Zheng Jinggui) in Kimberley Street. Chung in the Hockien dialect is Teh.

Penang Chinese Town Hall 
He became the prominent president (1881–1883) of the Penang Chinese Town Hall (also known as P'ing-chang hui-kuan P'I'I, P'ing-chang kung-kuan or its current official Chinese name, Hua-jen ta-hui-t'ang). Chung Keng Quee was a major donor towards the founding of the town hall (600 yuan) according to the inscription on a stone dated 1886 kept within the town hall.

Founder of the Guangdong Association in Taiping 
The Kwantung hui-kuan (Guangdong Association) along Temple Street in Taiping was founded in 1887 by Chung, Keng Quee and others as an association of people from Kuangtung (Guangdong) province in South China.

Penang Tseng Ch'eng Association 
The Straits Settlements Factory Records show that the association was headed by Chung Ah Yat and had 16 members in 1825. It was largely an inactive association until 1849 when Chung Keng Quee and others put up a new building for it.

Tseng Lung Association 
While he lived, he was a patron and benefactor to the Tseng-Lung Hui-kuan in Penang, Taiping and Gopeng. Chung, Keng Quee built the current temple-like premises of the Tseng Lung (Zeng Long) Association in Taiping in 1888, rebuilt the premises of the Tseng-Lung Hui-kuan, Gopeng in 1898 and the premises of the Tseng-lung Hui-kuan, Penang in 1886. The Tseng Lung Hui Kuan were associations for people from Tseng ch'eng and Lung-men (Longmen 龙门) counties of Kuang-chou (Guangzhou or Canton) prefecture in South China. According to Tan Kim Hong, Keng Quee whose father was an early leader of the association became the Chief Director of the association around 1890.

Principal donor to international charities

India Famine Relief Fund 
In 1897 the British establishment tried to drum up support for an India famine-relief drive. Penang millionaire and Deli Bank director Hsieh Yung-kuan, then Chinese vice-consul, contributed $200 and Chung, Keng Kwee gave $300 more, completely dwarfing the Governor who managed only $100. (See also Indian famine of 1896–97)

Transvaal War Fund 
On the twenty fourth day of collections for the Transvaal War Fund For Widows and Orphans Chung Keng Quee donated $1,000 bringing total for that day to $16,033. In March 1900 he donated $15,000 to the Transvaal War Fund (see Second Boer War), started in November 1899 by the Straits Times in connection with the South African War. For perspective the total amount collected was approximately $215,000 out of which $50,000 came from the government and $10,000 each came from Kapitan Yap Kuan Seng and Towkay Tet Shin.

Franco-Annam War Relief Fund 
On many other occasions he also contributed to various other charities including the War Relief Fund arising from the Franco-Annam war (see Annam (French protectorate) and Sino-French War) under the command of Viceroy Li Hongzhang. He donated 100,000 taels to the Ching Government to support China's war efforts against the French in Indochina.

Host to China's Admiral Ting 
In March 1894, Chung, Keng Quee hosted in his gardens, in the name of Vice Consul Chang, Pi Shih (Cheong Fatt Tze), a dinner to welcome Admiral Ting (see Battle of Yalu River (1894) and Battle of Weihaiwei) and the Chinese Imperial Fleet of warships that he commanded. These included the King Yuen (Captain Lin Yang Hing) and the Ching Yuen (Captain Yih Choo Kwei).

Queen Victoria's Golden & Diamond Jubilees 
"... his munificent gifts on such occasions as the two Jubilees of Her Late Majesty will not soon be forgotten."—The Perak Pioneer & Native States Advertiser VOL VIII Taiping Saturday 14 December 1901

Support for European engineers in Penang 
The Engineers' Institute was probably the first of its kind in the country. Opened for the recreation and general use of the engineers who formed a large part of the European community (30%). Originally the institute occupied rooms in Beach Street but later moved to a beautiful double storey building presented by the Capitan Chung Kheng Kwi at the junction of Leith Street and Farquhar Street. On 5 March 1888, an institute was opened for the recreation and general convenience of European mechanical engineers. For some time membership was confined exclusively to engineers and mechanics but was so popular that before long the regulations were altered so as to include deck officers, and certain longshoremen. The growth and development of the institute proceeded so rapidly that larger buildings were soon required, and, by arrangement with Kapitan Chung, Keng Quee, a new two-storey headquarters building was erected at the junction of Leith and Farquhar streets. Upon the staircase was a beautiful stained-glass window presented by Chung, Keng Quee, and bearing the inscription, "Erected by Captain Cheng Kheng Kwi, Perak and Pinang, 1901". Near at hand was a portrait of the donor.

Property donations 
When the Lim Ancestral Temple building on Beach Street was completed in 1866, the Kew Leong Tong (Hall of Nine Dragons) Lim Kongsi, one of the three Lim Clan Associations in Penang, moved its office there. The address was 234 Beach Street. Later, Ah Quee Street was established when Kapitan Chung, Keng Quee donated his Beach Street shophouse to be demolished to create the street that bears his name. Ah Quee Street runs beside 164 Beach Street which also happens to be the longest shophouse in Penang. (Source: Timothy Tye)

Recognition and reward by the Qing Imperial Government, China 
For his many acts of greatness the Manchu Qing dynasty Imperial government in 1894 conferred on him the title of "Mandarin, Second Rank" retrospectively for three generations. This meant that Kapitan Chung, Keng Quee, his father, Chung, Hsing Fah, and his grandfather, Chung, Tung Lin, the last two posthumously, simultaneously became Mandarins of the Second Rank. In line with his elevation he then adopted the fancy name of "Sheng Chih".

Townhouse and temple on Church Street 

In Georgetown, Penang Chung, Keng Quee became known as the city's great connoisseur of architecture.

In 1893, Chung, Keng Quee acquired two adjacent properties along Church Street on Penang Island. The first was the former headquarters of the Ghee Hin - the Hai San had ousted them in the 1870s. The second was a Chinese school, the Goh Hock Tong (or Ng Fook Tong in Cantonese) meaning Five Luck Villa. He offered the school an alternative site in Chulia Street, where a new building was completed in 1898.

Chung, Keng Quee converted the former Ghee Hin headquarters into his townhouse and office and named this, Hye Kee Chan (海记栈), or Sea Remembrance Store. It has interior fittings including Victorian cast iron columns from Walter Macfarlane & Co of Glasgow (also known as The Saracen Foundry).

Macfarlane was also responsible for the beautiful iron gates and fencing of the former Five Luck Villa building which was converted into a personal temple (Shen-chih hsueh-shu where Shen-chih was his fancy name and hsueh-shu means a traditional-style private family school).

In the temple stands a life-size bronze statue of Chung Keng Quee. The statue was commissioned by the Engineers' Institute that he had generously donated a new building to. It was created by Benjamin Creswick and a facsimile of it was shown at the Royal Academy of Arts in 1903. On the base of the statue will be found the signature of Benjamin Creswick, and an imprint, Broad and Sons, the bronze founders in Birmingham who cast the statue.

Today, Hye Kee Chan is more commonly known as the Pinang Peranakan Mansion. Open to the public, it serves as a museum showcasing the lifestyle, customs and traditions of the Peranakans or Straits Chinese - an example of adaptive reuse.

Roads 
Two streets in Penang were named after him, Keng Kwee Street and Ah Quee Street.

Progeny 
Kapitan Chung, Keng Quee had ten sons, the 4th and best known of whom was Chung Thye Phin. Chung, Keng Quee had four principal wives or "t'sais", including Lim Ah Chen whom he married early in life in China, Tan Gek Im who survived him and Teng Nyong who was the mother of Chung Thye Phin. He also had a secondary wife or "t'sip" Tan Ah Loy, mother of his daughter Cheang Ah Soo. They bore him 8 sons and 5 daughters.  He also had a child (Cheang, Thye Gan) (born 1893) alias Cheng Tai Kwong by a woman named Tye Thye.  His eldest son, Thye Yong, was adopted.

Sons

Chung Thye Yong

Chung Thye Phin

Chung Thye Siong 
Chung Thye Siong (1855–1907) was born in Penang, educated at both the Penang Free School and St. Xavier's Institution and went on to join together two important lineages by marrying (1893) Koh Chooi Peng, eldest daughter of Kaw Cheng Sian (辜禎善 / 辜祯善) who in turn was the son of Koh Seang Tat a descendant of Koh Lay Huan, the first Kapitan China of Penang. He helped in the management of his father's estate and lived in his father's residence in Church Street.

Daughters

Generation names and etymology 
Chung Keng Quee's generational name was "Keng" meaning "picture" or "landscape". The generation after him, "Thye" means "big" or "large" or "great". The next generation "Kok" means "country" or "land" and i.e. to do with the geography of a place. The generation after that, "choong" is the same word as "China". And the generation after that "Chung" means "originating from" or "coming from". When written out and read from the last generation, "Chung", to the first generation, "Keng", it reads, 从中國大景 : "Coming from China, a big picture", or "From China comes a great visionary".

Death 
Kapitan China Chung Keng Quee died at the age of 74 on 13 December 1901 after a brief illness of only a few days.

The Perak Administrative Report for 1901:
"The death of Captain Cheang Keng Kwi is announced. He held the title for 30 years. It is no longer required and is allowed to lapse as the Protector (of Chinese) working under the Federal Secretary for Chinese Affairs is the best intermediary between the Government and the Chinese."

The Malay Mail Monday 16 December 1901:
"The late Capitan China of Perak is said to have died worth $10,000,000."

The Perak Pioneer & Native States Advertiser Vol VII Taiping Saturday 14 December 1901:
"By the death of Capitan Chang Keng Kwi, which occurred at his residence in Penang on Thursday night, one of the most picturesque figures in the history of Malaysia has been removed."

Reported net worth 
He made his fortune early in his life in the tin mines and revenue farms of Perak, and while lost it all during the Larut Wars, he rebuilt his empire and died a rich man. At the time of his death:
 he had held the Perak Revenue Farms for twelve years
 he owned ten mines employing an aggregate of 1,000 coolies
 his property in Hong Kong was estimated at $10,000,000
 his property in Beach Street, Penang was valued at $1,500,000

According to the Ipoh Echo he was the richest man in the Federated Malay States and, when he died, the whole of his estate in Penang alone was worth seven million Straits dollars. The Singapore Free Press and Mercantile Advertiser wrote, "The property of the late Cheang Keng Kwi is valued at ten millions," and reported that he was the largest tin miner in the Peninsula and owned a tenth part of Georgetown Penang in addition to property in Perak and Hong Kong at the time of his death.

Final acts of charity 
He was a generous man given to acts of charity and besides Chinese educational institutions he had given money to the Free School ($12,000) and the Brother's School ($6,000).

Funerary 
He left behind a wife, ten sons and five daughters, 20 grandchildren, and four great grandchildren.

Chung, Keng Quee was buried in the Chung Family Burial Plot in Mount Erskine purchased beforehand by himself and his daughter Chung, Kang Neoh.

His tomb is dated 1898. It was named "Region of Long Life", and Franke (Chinese Epigraphy. ..) believed that it was built before the great man died and was probably set up on the occasion of the demise of the wife who pre-deceased him. In his book published in 1985 Franke declared it was "the largest Chinese tomb in the whole of Malaysia. ..appropriate only to members of the imperial family or to the highest officials" and incorporating four-man-sized statues (the only tomb in Malaysia with statues of this kind) "called weng-chung. .. ...permitted only for the tombs of officials of the first rank."

His headstone bears the inscription:

"Kapitan of Perak, Chung Keng Quee from Tseng-ch'eng, appointed by Imperial patent of the Ch'ing Emperor as Tzu-cheng ta-fu, rewarded with the Peacock Feather, and Expectant Intendant of a Circuit of the fourth rank, and of his wife Lady Cheng, nee Ch'en, with the personal name Yii-yin and the posthumous name Chao-i appointed by Imperial patent as Third Rank Shu-jen, set up by nine sons, six daughters, twelve grandsons, and six granddaughters of the deceased."

Lee, Eng Kew (Ah Kew The Digger) named his book about Taiping and its historical figures, Yi Guo (which literally means "to move country"), words derived from the inscriptions on the grave of Chung, Keng Quee.

Although he died in December 1901, he was only laid in his final resting place in 1904. On Sunday 11 May 1902 (almost five months after he left this world), his remains were removed from Hye Kee Chan (29 Church Street) and placed in a temporary vault awaiting his final interment. The funeral procession from home to the family graveyard made up of people on foot and on rickshaws was reported to have been over a mile long and included several hundred Europeans catered to by Messrs Sarkies Brothers. Security was personally supervised by the CPO of Penang. The Straits Times reported that his funeral procession took an hour and a half to pass a fixed point.

Taiping Lake Gardens 
One of his mining pools was donated for public use and is today the Taiping Lake Gardens. The work began in the early eighteen eighties. By 1893, a large area comprising swamps and abandoned mining pools was drained, levelled, planted and fenced for a public garden in Taiping. In 1911, it was considered to be perhaps the most beautiful of any gardens in the then Federated Malay States.

Chung surname 
 Pinyin Romanisation: Zheng4 Zhèng
 Chinese Character (Traditional Big5): 鄭
 B5 No.: 7
 Meaning: Serious; Solemn
 Wade–Giles Romanisation/Pronunciation: Cheng4
 Cantonese Romanisation/Pronunciation: Cheng
 Hockien Romanisation/Pronunciation: Teh
 Others: Chung, Chang, Cheang (esp. Hong Kong)
The surname Zheng4 is about 2370 years old.

According to Chung, Yoon-Ngan "the surname Zheng4 originated in an area referred to during the Han Dynasty as Ying Yang Prefecture (滎陽郡 / 荥阳郡). The present day location of Ying Yang Prefecture is in an area about 17 kilometers southwest of Ying Ze county (滎澤縣 / 荥泽县) of Henan province."

Further reading 

 Nostalgia Taiping Oleh Syah Rul Aswari Abdullah published on Thursday 4 October 2007 by Harian Metro
 Cerpen Sunlie Thomas Alexander, Sebuah Kota, Serupa Imaji, seperti Mimpi... published on 27 April 2008 by SuaraMerdeka.com
 Orang-orang Cina di Tanah Melayu By Nik Hasnaa Nik Mahmood Published by Penerbit UTM   pp. 70, 114, 115, 120, 124, 331, 333
 Historical Personalities of Penang By Historical Personalities of Penang Committee Published by Historical Personalities of Penang Committee, 1986 pp. 47, 81
 Records and Recollections (1889–1934): Chinese Women, Prostitution & a Welfare Organisation By Neil Jin Keong Khor, Keat Siew Khoo, Izrin Muaz Md. Adnan Published by Malaysian Branch of the Royal Asiatic Society, 2004   p. 26
 The Making of Modern South-East Asia By D. J. M. Tate Published by Oxford University Press, 1971 p. 300
 Journal of the Malayan Branch of the Royal Asiatic Society (Vol. 3, pt. 2 comprises a monograph entitled: British Malaya, 1864–1867, by L.A. Mills, with appendix by C. O. Blagden, 1925. Issued also separately) By Malaysian Branch, Royal Asiatic Society of Great Britain and Ireland Malaysian Branch, Singapore Published by, 1991 pp. 4, 22, 24, 80, 82, 86, 87
 Pour une histoire du développement By Catherine Coquery-Vidrovitch, Daniel Hemery, Jean Piel Published by L'Harmattan, 2008  p. 182
 Mitteilungen der deutschen Gesellschaft für Natur- und Völkerkunde Ostasiens By Gesellschaft für Natur- und Völkerkunde Ostasiens, Deutsche Gesellschaft für Natur- und Völkerkunde Ostasiens, Tokyo Published by Der Gesellschaft, 1979 p. 477
 Peninjau sejarah: journal of the History Teachers' Association of Malaya By History Teachers' Association of Malaya, Universiti Malaya Jabatan Sejarah, History Teachers' Association of Malaya Published by History Teachers' Association of Malaya, 1966 p. 29
 Rites of Belonging: Memory, Modernity, and Identity in a Malaysian Chinese Community By Jean DeBernardi, Jean Elizabeth DeBernardi Published by Stanford University Press, 2004 p. 307
 Tōnan Ajia kenkyū By Kyōto Daigaku Tōnan Ajia Kenkyū Sentā Published by Kyōto Daigaku Tōnan Ajia Kenkyū Sentā., 1987 p. 414
 Larut Wars (1972-1874) by Badriyah Haji Salleh in Southeast Asia: A Historical Encyclopedia, from Angkor Wat to East Timor By Keat Gin Ooi, Contributor Keat Gin Ooi, Published by ABC-CLIO, 2004  p. 775
 Kapitan China System by Ooi, Keat Gin in Southeast Asia: A Historical Encyclopedia, from Angkor Wat to East Timor By Keat Gin Ooi, Contributor Keat Gin Ooi, Published by ABC-CLIO, 2004  p. 711
 The Journals of J. W. W. Birch, First British Resident to Perak, 1874-1875: First British Resident to Perak, 1874-75 By James Wheeler Woodford Birch, Peter Laurie Burns Contributor Peter Laurie Burns Published by Oxford University Press, 1976 pp. 11, 63, 64, 83, 161
 British Intervention in Malaya, 1867-1877 By Cyril Northcote Parkinson Published by University of Malaya Press, 1960 pp. 77, 91, 92
 Pickering: Protector of Chinese By Robert Nicholas Jackson Published by Oxford U. P., 1965 p. 22
 Immigrant Labour and the Development of Malaya, 1786-1920: A Historical Monograph By Robert Nicholas Jackson Published by Printed at the Govt. Press, 1961 p. 41
 The Making of Modern Malaya: A History from Earliest Times to the Present By N. J. Ryan Published by Oxford University Press, 1963 p. xi
 The Mining Magazine: For Minerals Industry Management Worldwide Vols. 1 (September 1909) - 145 (December 1981) Published by Mining Publications, 1909 p. 123
 The Malay States, 1877-1895: Political Change and Social Policy By Philip Fook Seng Loh Published by Oxford University Press, 1969 pp. 111, 142, 214
 The Malayan Tin Industry to 1914: With Special Reference to the States of Perak, Selangor, Negri, Sembilan, and Pahang By Lin Ken Wong Published by Published for the Association for Asian Studies by the University of Arizona Press, 1965 pp. 65, 84, 86
 Nineteenth-century Malaya: The Origins of British Political Control By Charles Donald Cowan Published by Oxford University Press, 1961 pp. 119, 125, 278
 Records of the Geological Survey of India By Geological Survey of India Published by The Survey, 1893 p. 44
 Events Prior to British Ascendancy: Notes on Perak History By Richard James Wilkinson Published by Printed by J. Russell at the F.M.S. gov't press, 1908 & 1924 p. 113
 Der Urquell By Verein für verbreitung volksthümlich-wissenschaftlicher kunde Published by E.J. Brill, 1898 p. 162
 The Impact of Chinese Secret Societies in Malaya: A Historical Study By Wilfred Blythe, Royal Institute of International Affairs Published by Issued under the auspices of the Royal Institute of International Affairs [by] Oxford U.P., 1969 120, 174, 176
 Pangkor Engagement
 Chinese Locality and Dialect Groups in the 19th-Century Straits Settlements by Lau-fong Mak published Number 63 (Spring 1987) Bulletin of the Institute of Ethnology Academia Sinica
 Chinese Coolie Trade in the Straits Settlements in Late Nineteenth Century by Chen-tung Chang published Number 65 (Spring 1988) Bulletin of the Institute of Ethnology Academia Sinica
 The Development of the Tin Mining Industry of Malaya by Yip, Yat Hoong, (1969) Kuala Lumpur, Malaysia: University of Malaya Press. Page 97
 Calendar of Probate and Administration, Hong Kong Supreme Court Returns for the year 1902 (No 11/1903) dated 13 March 1903, Page 73 by Registrar J. W. Norton-Keyne
 Calendar of Probate and Administration, Hong Kong Report to the Registrar of the Supreme Court for the year 1905 (No 8/1906), Page 77
 The Selangor Journal: Jottings Past and Present, Vol V, Published 1897, Selangor Government Printing Office
 The China Mail (Hong Kong, Estd 1845), Monday 30 December 1901, Page 2
 Tin Mining In Larut by Doyle 1879 republished in 1963 in the Journal of the Malayan Branch of the Royal Asiatic Society
 British Rule In Malaya: The Malayan Civil Service and its Predecessors, 1867 - 1942 by Robert Heussler, Clio Press, Oxford, England, 1981; 
 Swettenham by H. S. Barlow published by Southdene Sdn Bhd KL 1995
 Chinese Epigraphic Materials in Malaysia (Volume 2) - collected, annotated, and edited by Wolfgang Franke and Chen Tieh Fan published 1985 by University of Malaya Press, 
 Koh Seang Thye v Chung Ah Quee (1886) 4 Ky 136 – 3 [3155]
 The Big Five Hokkien Families in Penang, 1830s–1890s by Yeetuan Wong
 The Western Malay States 1850–1873: the Effects of Commercial Development on Malay Politics, p. 209 by Khoo Kay Kim, Arkib Negara Malaysia
 Negeri-negeri Melayu Pantai Barat, 1850–1873: Kesan Perkembangan Dagang Terhadap Politik Melayu, Translation of: The Western Malay States, 1850–1873, By Prof. Khoo, Kay Kim Published 1984 by Fajar Bakti
 Xiao En E-Magazine 23/09/2002, 19/09/2001, 19/09/2001
 中央 硏究院 民族学 硏究所 集刊 By Zhong yang yan jiu yuan Min zu xue yan jiu suo, 中央 硏究院 民族学 硏究所 Published 1956 中央 硏究院 民族学 硏究所 (Pages 93, 94 & 98)
 "Generations: The Story of Batu Gajah" By Ho, Tak Ming Published 2005 by Ho, Tak Ming  pp. 105, 108, 120
 THE KAPITAN SYSTEM  - XI By Wu Liu (pen name of Mr. C. S. Wong/Wong, Choon San) published in the Sunday Gazette, 19 June 1960, Penang
 A gallery of Chinese kapitans. by Mr. C. S. Wong/Wong, Choon San; Published in Singapore: Ministry of Culture, 1963. 114p. [DS596 Won]
 Twentieth Century Impressions of British Malaya: its history, people, commerce, industries, and resources, by Arnold Wright, Published 1908 - Page 130, 203, 252, 262, 508, 509, 568
 The Record of Meritorious Deeds of the Chung Family, op. cit., pp. 9–12
 "Miscellaneous Chronicles of Penang", Kuang, Kuo-hsiang op. cit., pp. 112–113
 The Case of the Chinese in Penang, 1890s-1910s | SHINOZAKI Kaori, PhD student
 200 years of the Hakkas in Penang (槟城客家两百年) By the Federation of Hakka Associations of Malaysia
 Reveal the True Face of Secret Societies (揭开私会党真面目) Written by Guo Rende (郭仁德) Published by the Malaysian Chinese Cultural Center
 "The Luxuriant Tree" and "Chung Keng Kwee, the Hakka Kapitan" by CHUNG Yoon-Ngan (郑永元)
 Heritage Road named in honour of Chung Thye Phin by Sita Ram, Stories of Yesteryear, The Ipoh Echo 16–31 March 2006
 Honoured in Penang for his generosity [on philanthropist Chung Keng Kwee, 1849-1901]. The Star, 6 December 2001 by Catherine Chong
 Chung Keng Quee Temple Doors Opened, The Star 5 July 2000
 Help From China To Restore Chung Keng Quee Temple, The Star, 8 November 2002
 Turning Chung Keng Quee Temple into A Museum, The Star 16 January 2003
 Restoration of Hai Kee Chan, The Star, Friday 3 October 2003
 Kapitan's great-grandson By CHOONG KWEE KIM, The Star Thursday 9 September 2004
 Producer hopes to make movie on Kapitan Cina of Perak By CHOONG KWEE KIM, THE STAR
 The Star Online > Features Saturday, 21 September 2002 Taiping revived
 Lee Eng Kew (AH Kew The Digger), self-taught field researcher
 66 Usahawan Malaysia (66 Malaysian Entrepreneurs) by Ashadi Zain,  Cerita 50 Mendiang Chung Keng Kwee
 A History of Malaya by R.O. Winstedt Published in March 1935
 The Chinese in Malaya by Victor Purcell C.M.C. PhD published in 1948 pp. 264, 266, 268
 The Mandarin-Capitalists from Nanyang: Overseas Chinese Enterprise in the Modernisation of China. .. By Michael R. Godley Published by Cambridge University Press 25 July 2002
 Gangsters Into Gentlemen: The Breakup of Multiethnic Conglomerates and The Rise of A Straits Chinese Identity in Penang by Engseng Ho, Department of Anthropology, William James Hall, Harvard University Cambridge, MA 02138, presented at The Penang Story International Conference 2002, 18–21 April 2002, The City Bayview Hotel, Penang, Malaysia - Organised by The Penang Heritage Trust & Star Publications.
 TANJONG, HILIR PERAK, LARUT AND KINTA -- THE PENANG-PERAK NEXUS IN HISTORY by Prof. Emeritus Dato' Dr. Khoo Kay Kim, Department of History, University of Malaya
 SEJARAH DAERAH DAN PEJABAT - LAMAN RASMI PEJABAT DAERAH LARUT MATANG DAN SELAMA SEJARAH DAERAH DAN PEJABAT - Perak State Government Website
 Perak Tourist Information Centre, Ipoh City Council
 Taiping Town Council/Laman Rasmi Majlis Perbandaran Taiping
 Will of Cheang Ah Quee 17 July 1894
 Chinese Secret Societies. [Harper's new monthly magazine. / Volume 83, Issue 489, September 1891]
 Editor's Drawer. [Harper's new monthly magazine. / Volume 84, Issue 499, December 1891]
 A Social History of The Chinese in Singapore and Malaya 1800 - 1911 by Yen Ching-Hwang, Singapore, Oxford University Press, New York 1986
 Annexation in the Malay States: The Jervois Papers edited/compiled by Burns, Peter L. published by Journal of the Malaysian Branch of the Royal Asiatic Society. 72:14-93, Issue Date: 1999
 The Mining Magazine edited by Thomas Arthur Rickard Published by Mining Journal, 1919; Item notes: v.20 1919 Jan-Jun; p. 123
 Tōnan Ajia kenkyū By Kyōto Daigaku Tōnan Ajia Kenkyū Sentā Published by Kyōto Daigaku Tōnan Ajia Kenkyū Sentā., 1987; Item notes: v.25 1987–1988; p. 259
 The Rise of Ersatz Capitalism in South-East Asia by Kunio Yoshihara
 All India Reporter - 1929
 Immigrant Labour and the Development of Malaya, 1786-1920: A Historical Monograph By Robert Nicholas Jackson Published by Printed at the Govt. Press, 1961; p. 40
 Chinese Secret Societies in Malaya: A Survey of the Triad Society from 1800 to 1900 By Leon Comber Published by Published for the Association for Asian Studies by J.J. Augustin, 1959; p. 194
 A History of Perak By Richard Olof Winstedt, Richard James Wilkinson, William Edward Maxwell, Royal Asiatic Society of Great Britain and Ireland Malaysian Branch Published by Malaysian Branch of the Royal Asiatic Society, 1974; p. 116, 117
 The Western Malay States, 1850–1873: the effects of commercial development on Malay politics By Kay Kim Khoo Published by Oxford University Press, 1972; 137, 237
 The Chinese in Southeast Asia By Victor Purcell, Royal Institute of International Affairs Published by Oxford University Press, 1965; pp. 266, 611
 Events Prior to British Ascendancy ...: Notes on Perak History ... By Richard James Wilkinson Published by Printed by J. Russell at the F.M.S. gov't press, 1908 Item notes: v.1-5 (1908–1911); p. 10
 Immigrant Labour and the Development of Malaya, 1786-1920: A Historical Monograph By Robert Nicholas Jackson Published by Printed at the Govt. Press, 1961; p. 41
 The Impact of Chinese Secret Societies in Malaya: A Historical Study By Wilfred Blythe, Royal Institute of International Affairs Published by Issued under the auspices of the Royal Institute of International Affairs [by] Oxford U.P., 1969; p. 249
 The Making of Modern Malaya: A History from Earliest Times to Independence By N. J. Ryan Published by Oxford University Press, 1965; pp. xi, 110
 Peninjau sejarah: journal of the History Teachers' Association of Malaya By History Teachers' Association of Malaya, Universiti Malaya Jabatan Sejarah, History Teachers' Association of Malaya Published by History Teachers' Association of Malaya, 1966; Item notes: v.1-2:1; pp. 29, 30, 37
 新马华族史料文献汇目 (Xin Ma Hua zu shi liao wen xian hui mu): Classified bibliography of Chinese historical materials in Malaysia and Singapore / Tay Lian Soo By Liangshu Zheng, 郑良树 Published by Nanyang xue hui, 1984; 
 Malaixiya Xinjiapo Hua ren wen hua shi lun cong By Liangshu Zheng, 郑良树 Published by Xinjiapo Nanyang xue hui, 1982; Item notes: v.1
 邝国祥《槟城散记》内载：《郑景贵其人》（新加坡：世界书局有限公司，1958）页111-112。
 Perak Et Les Orang-Sakeys (Perak and the Orang Sakeys) by Brau De Saint-Pol Lias, Paris, 1883
 "Rajah Abdulah Mohamat Shah ibn Almarhome Sultan Japahar to the Chinese Chiefs of the Sening Tew Chew and the Tew Chew Factions of the Chinese at Larut," 11 August 1873, PRO/Admiralty 125/140
 Secret trades, porous borders: smuggling and states along a Southeast Asian ... By Eric Tagliacozzo
 Birthday Eulogy of Chang Keng Kui otherwise called The paper presented to Chang Keng Kui on his 75th birthday by Chang Pi-shih and others cited in 'A Biography of Chang Keng Kui' in Ping-ch'eng san-chi (Anecdotes of Penang/An Anecdotal History of Penang) by K'uang Kuo-hsiang, Hong Kong, 1958, p112
 Modern Asian studies, Volume 21, Cambridge University Press., 1987, P423

Court cases 

Chang Ah Quee & Others vs Huttenbach, Liebest & Co.
Cheang Thye Phin & Others v Tan Ah Loy, Privy Council (1920) & (1921)
Cheang Thye Phin v Lim Ah Chen/Lim Ah Cheng and others; p. 317
Cheang Thye Phin v Lam Kin Sang
Koh Seang Thye v Chung Ah Quee [1886] 4 Ky 136 – 3 [3155]
Cheang Thye Gan v Lim Ah Chen & Others [0. J. No. 189 OF 1918], Cheang Thye Gan v Lim Ah Chen, (1921) 16 H.K.L.R. 19, H.K.L.R. 1957
"...that she was not received in the Penang family house owing to the jealousy of Tan Gek Im who refused her. No definite finding here appears necessary, but this point should be borne in mind in view of subsequent developments. Plaintiff was provided with a separate house by Cheang Ah Kwee in which she lived until 1901. In 1893 she bore Cheang Ah Kwee a son, Cheang Thye Gan who died a few ....", "Special provision was made for Cheang Thye Gan by Cheang Ah Kwee in his Will. ..."

References

Notes 
 Church Street where Kapitan Chung Keng Quee's townhouse and office, Hye Kee Chan, still stands, used to be called Ghee Hin Street after the Ghee Hin Society's Congsee house that Ah Quee purchased, demolished and built his townhouse on top of.

Sources

People 
 Timothy Tye who has been researching Chung Keng Quee for AsiaExplorers' microsite on Hai Kee Chan mansion and Chung Keng Kwee temple
 Historian Khoo Salma Nasution
 Jeffery Seow

1827 births
1901 deaths
Businesspeople from Guangzhou
Malaysian businesspeople
Malaysian people of Hakka descent
People from Zengcheng
Triad members
History of Penang
History of Perak
People from British Malaya
Kapitan Cina